The Environmentally Sensitive Lands Protection Program (ESLPP) is a land acquisition program in Sarasota County, Florida dedicated to acquiring and preserving the natural Florida habitat within the county.

History
The program is funded by taxes and was approved by voters in a referendum in March 1999. The initial referendum allowed the county to collect 0.25 mil (25 cents for every $1,000 of taxable value) in ad valorem tax through 2019 which was used for the acquisition, protection, and management of environmentally sensitive lands. A second referendum was approved by voters in November 2005, extending the program to 2029, and included neighborhood parkland acquisitions. This expanded the program to have a Neighborhood Parkland Acquisition Program (NPP). The county also acquires land through other means, such as grants, donations, partnerships, and conservation easements.

,  have been acquired through the ESLPP program.

List of land bought by ESLPP funds
 Circus Hammock
 Curry Creek Preserve
 Deer Prairie Creek Preserve
 Lemon Bay Preserve
 Manasota Scrub Preserve
 Old Miakka Preserve
 Pocono Trail Preserve
 Red Bug Slough Preserve
 Sleeping Turtles Preserve
 Warm Mineral Springs

See also
Environmentally Endangered Lands Programs
Florida Forever

References

Sarasota County, Florida
Environment of Florida
1999 establishments in Florida